"Standing in the Way of Control" is a single by American indie rock band Gossip from the album of the same name. The remix by Le Tigre was released in 2005, the original was then released as a single in 2006, and was re-released again on February 26, 2007. The 2006 issue had climbed up to number 13 on the UK Singles Chart in early 2007 on download sales, but the 2007 re-release was under a new catalogue number, meaning that their six-place climb to number seven on March 4 was listed as a new entry rather than as a climber. But it reached the top spot in the UK Indie Chart for one week.

The Soulwax Nite Versions remix of the song featured heavily in the advertising campaign for the 2007 E4 television drama, Skins. This version is also on the series' soundtrack album. Kim Gordon, bassist of Sonic Youth, contributed the cover art for the single. Brace Paine asked her to contribute her handwriting to the album as he had appreciated her "punk rock font" he once saw on an old UT flier.

In May 2007, NME magazine placed "Standing in the Way of Control" at number 23 in its list of the "50 Greatest Indie Anthems Ever".  In October 2011, NME placed it at number 34 on its list "150 Best Tracks of the Past 15 Years". In 2009, Pitchfork placed the song at number 429 on its list "Top 500 Greatest Tracks of the 2000s".

Song meaning
The song was written by lead singer Beth Ditto as a response to the Federal Marriage Amendment which would have constitutionally outlawed same-sex marriage in the United States. She says of the song:

Music video
The video was recorded live in Liverpool, England.

Composition
"Standing in the Way of Control" is a driving indie rock song with punk and disco influences.

The song is in common time with a chord sequence of Am-C-D-G in the key of C major.

Track listings
Le Tigre Remix 12-inch vinyl
 "Standing in the Way of Control"
 "Standing in the Way of Control Remix" (Le Tigre remix)

UK CD single
 "Standing in the Way of Control" (Radio edit)
 "Standing in the Way of Control" (Le Tigre remix)
 "Standing in the Way of Control" (Album version)
 "Standing in the Way of Control" (Video CD-ROM)

UK 7-inch single
 "Standing in the Way of Control" by Angie Tuck

UK 12-inch single
 "Standing in the Way of Control" (Headman remix)
 "Standing in the Way of Control" (Soulwax Nite version)
 "Standing in the Way of Control" (Playgroup remix)
 "Standing in the Way of Control" (Tronik Youth remix)

2007 UK CD single
 "Standing in the Way of Control" (Radio Edit)
 "Standing in the Way of Control" (Soulwax Nite Version)
 "Coal to Diamonds"
 "Standing in the Way of Control" (Video)

2006 7-inch single
 "Standing in the Way of Control" (Le Tigre Remix, 7" edit)
 "Standing in the Way of Control" (Live at the 100 Club London)

2006 7-inch single
 "Standing in the Way of Control"
 "Sick with It"

Personnel
 Beth Ditto – vocals
 Brace Paine – guitar, bass guitar
 Hannah Blilie – drums

Charts

Weekly charts

Year-end charts

Certifications

References

External links
 PUNKCAST#840 "Standing in the Way of Control" live @ Knitting Factory NYC, Sep 16 2005. (RealPlayer, mp4) 

2005 singles
2005 songs
2006 singles
Gossip (band) songs
LGBT-related songs
Songs written by Beth Ditto
Songs written by Hannah Blilie